Ivan Zarev (born February 25, 1986) is a Bulgarian volleyball player. He is the current reserve setter of the Bulgarian national team. Zarev made his club debut for Slavia Sofia and is now playing for CSKA Sofia.

References

1986 births
Living people
Bulgarian men's volleyball players